Route 158 is an east-west arterial road running between Lachute and Berthierville, north of the Ottawa and Saint Lawrence rivers, in the Laurentides region.

It runs parallel to Autoroute 50 from Lachute to Autoroute 15 near Mirabel Airport, also passing through Joliette. A section of the 158 in Joliette is a four-lane short freeway and was intended to be part of an eastern extension of A-50 towards A-40 in Berthierville by-passing several accident-prone sections of Highway 158.

In Berthierville, it junctions with Autoroute 40 and Route 138 and ends on the island municipality of Saint-Ignace-de-Loyola at the Saint Lawrence River, which can be crossed by car ferry to Route 132 in Sorel-Tracy.

Municipalities along Route 158

 Lachute
 Mirabel
 Saint-Jérôme
 Sainte-Sophie
 Saint-Lin-Laurentides
 Saint-Esprit
 Saint-Alexis
 Saint-Jacques
 Crabtree
 Saint-Paul
 Joliette
 Saint-Thomas
 Sainte-Geneviève-de-Berthier
 Berthierville
 La Visitation-de-l'Île-Dupas
 Saint-Ignace-de-Loyola

See also
 List of Quebec provincial highways

References

External links 
 Interactive Provincial Route Map (Transports Québec) 

158